The following is a list of squads for all sixteen national teams that competed at the 2021 UEFA European Under-21 Championship. Each national team had to submit a final squad of 23 players, three of whom had to be goalkeepers.

Players in boldface were capped at full international level prior to being called up.

Group stage

Age, caps, goals and club as of 24 March 2021.

Group A

Germany
Head coach: Stefan Kuntz

The squad was announced on 15 March 2021.

Hungary
Head coach: Zoltán Gera

The squad was announced on 15 March 2021.

Netherlands
Head coach: Erwin van de Looi

The squad was announced on 15 March 2021. On 21 March, it was announced that Lutsharel Geertruida would be replacing Jurriën Timber due to illness.

Romania
Head coach: Adrian Mutu

The squad was announced on 16 March 2021. On 19 March, it was announced that Adrian Petre would be replacing Valentin Costache.

Group B

Czech Republic
Head coach: Karel Krejčí

The squad was announced on 15 March 2021.

Italy
Head coach: Paolo Nicolato

The squad was announced on 15 March 2021. On 19 March, Andrea Pinamonti was replaced by Lorenzo Colombo, because of his unavailability due to COVID-19 quarantine restrictions applied to Inter Milan players. On 23 March, Samuele Ricci withdrew from the squad, with Andrea Pinamonti subsequently returning to the official squad list, though he was not present at the tournament.

Slovenia
Head coach: Milenko Ačimovič

Spain
Head coach: Luis de la Fuente

The squad was announced on 15 March 2021. On 19 March, Mateu Morey withdrew injured and was replaced by Yeremy Pino.

Group C

Denmark
Head coach:  Albert Capellas

The squad was announced on 15 March 2021.

France
Head coach: Sylvain Ripoll

The squad was announced on 15 March 2021. On 21 March, Houssem Aouar and Moussa Diaby were ruled out due to injury and replaced by Armand Laurienté and Alexis Claude-Maurice.

Iceland
Head coach: Davíð Snorri Jónasson

The squad was announced on 18 March 2021.

Russia
Head coach: Mikhail Galaktionov

The squad was announced on 15 March 2021. On 20 March, Konstantin Kuchayev was ruled out due to an injury and replaced by Konstantin Tyukavin.

Group D

Croatia
Head coach: Igor Bišćan

The squad was announced on 9 March 2021. On 18 March, Joško Gvardiol was ruled out due to an injury and replaced by David Čolina. On 21 March, Luka Sučić was ruled out due to an injury and replaced by Matej Vuk. On 22 March, Borna Sosa was ruled out due to an injury and replaced by Hrvoje Babec.

England
Head coach: Aidy Boothroyd

The squad was announced on 15 March 2021. On 23 March, Todd Cantwell was called up to replace the injured Mason Greenwood.

Portugal
Head coach: Rui Jorge

The squad was announced on 15 March 2021. On 19 March 2021, forwards Rafael Leão and Jota Filipe were ruled out of the tournament due to injury, being replaced by Gonçalo Ramos and João Mário.

Switzerland
Head coach: Mauro Lustrinelli

The squad was announced on 15 March 2021. On 20 March, Noah Okafor withdrew injured and was replaced by Kevin Rüegg.

Knockout stage

Age, caps, goals and club as of 31 May 2021.

Croatia
Head coach: Igor Bišćan

The squad was announced on 17 May 2021. On 25 May, Luka Sučić, Dario Vizinger and Mihael Žaper withdrew and were replaced by Neven Đurasek, Sandro Kulenović and Matej Vuk.

Denmark
Head coach:  Albert Capellas

The squad was announced on 21 May 2021. On 28 May, Mads Bech Sørensen withdrew injured and was replaced by Simon Graves Jensen.

France
Head coach: Sylvain Ripoll

The squad was announced on 20 May 2021. On 24 May, Randal Kolo Muani and Alban Lafont withdrew due to club obligations, while Wesley Fofana withdrew injured, and were replaced by  Axel Disasi, Etienne Green and Arnaud Kalimuendo. On 26 May, Adrien Truffert withdrew injured and was replaced by Nicolas Cozza.

Germany
Head coach: Stefan Kuntz

The squad was announced on 24 May 2021. On 25 May, Maxim Leitsch withdrew injured and was replaced by Lars Lukas Mai. On 30 May, Janni Serra withdrew injured and was replaced by Shinta Appelkamp.

Italy
Head coach: Paolo Nicolato

The squad was announced on 24 May 2021.

Netherlands
Head coach: Erwin van de Looi

The squad was announced on 21 May 2021. On 24 May, Noa Lang and Deyovaisio Zeefuik withdrew injured, while Ludovit Reis withdrew due to club obligations, and were replaced by Mats Knoester and Kaj Sierhuis (thus reducing the squad to 22 players). On 26 May, Brian Brobbey withdrew injured and no replacement was added (thus reducing the squad to 21 players), though he was still included in the official squad list with the number 19 shirt.

Portugal
Head coach: Rui Jorge

The squad was announced on 21 May 2021. On 24 May, Thierry Correia withdrew due to a positive COVID-19 test, while Francisco Trincão withdrew due to quarantine as a close contact, and were replaced by Abdu Conté and Filipe Soares.

Spain
Head coach: Luis de la Fuente

The squad was announced on 21 May 2021. On 26 May, Jon Moncayola withdrew injured and was replaced by Antonio Blanco.

References

Squads
UEFA European Under-21 Championship squads